This article is about the particular significance of the year 1993 to Wales and its people.

Incumbents 

 Secretary of State for Wales – David Hunt (until 27 May); John Redwood
 Archbishop of Wales – Alwyn Rice Jones, Bishop of St Asaph
 Archdruid of the National Eisteddfod of Wales – John Gwilym Jones

Events 

 13 January - Wayne Edwards from Cefn Mawr is the first British soldier killed in the Bosnian War.
 April – Childline Wales is launched by George Thomas, Viscount Tonypandy.
 11 June
 Five hundred homes in Llandudno are damaged by flash floods, and 2500 people are evacuated.
 Welsh-born Dr John Savage becomes prime minister of Nova Scotia.
 John Redwood, recently appointed Secretary of State for Wales, attracts ridicule after being filmed attempting to mime to the Welsh national anthem at the Welsh Conservative Party conference, when he clearly did not know the words.
 20 August - Closure of the Royal Navy Propellant Factory, Caerwent.
 21 October - The Welsh Language Act receives Royal Assent, placing Welsh on an equal footing with English within the public sector in Wales.
 31 December – Terry Yorath is sacked after five years as manager of the Wales national football team.
 The University of Wales celebrates its centenary.
 The government announces the privatisation of DVOIT, the former IT arm of the Driver and Vehicle Licensing Agency, Swansea's biggest employer. DVLA contracts for the provision of IT services are let to EDS.
 Laura Tenison sets up the maternity and babywear retailer JoJo Maman Bébé in Newport.

Arts and literature

Awards 

 National Eisteddfod of Wales (held in Llanelwedd)
 National Eisteddfod of Wales: Chair – Meirion MacIntyre Huws, "Gwawr"
 National Eisteddfod of Wales: Crown – Eirwyn George
 National Eisteddfod of Wales: Prose Medal – Mihangel Morgan, Dirgel Ddyn
 Gwobr Goffa Daniel Owen – Endaf Jones, Mewn Cornel Fechan Fach
 Wales Book of the Year:
 English language: Robert Minhinnick – Watching the Fire Eater
 Welsh language: Robin Llywelyn – Seren Wen ar Gefndir Gwyn

New books

English language 

 Thomas Charles-Edwards – Early Irish and Welsh Kinship
 Gillian Clarke – The King of Britain's Daughter
 Janet Davies – The Welsh Language
 John Davies – A History of Wales
 Glenys Kinnock & Fiona Millar – By Faith and Daring
 Saunders Lewis – Selected Poems
 Phil Rickman – Crybbe

Welsh language 

 Geraint Bowen – O Groth y Ddaear (autobiography)
 Moses Glyn Jones – Y Dewin a cherddi eraill
 Mihangel Morgan - Saith Pechod Marwol

Music 

 Psychedelic rock band Super Furry Animals is formed in Cardiff.
 The Hennessys – Caneuon Cynnar
 Siân James – Distaw
 Michael Jones – Rouge
 John Pickard – String Quartet no. 2
 Meic Stevens – Er Cof Am Blant Y Cwm (album)

Film 

 Anthony Hopkins plays C. S. Lewis in the film version of Shadowlands.

Welsh-language films 

 Tân ar y Comin Broadcasting 

 1 January – S4C becomes responsible for selling its own advertising air time.
 16 December – Tim Vincent becomes Blue Peter's first Welsh presenter.

 Welsh-language television 

 Dafydd Delweddau Zimbabwe, presented by Iwan Bala

 English-language television 

 Paul Rhys and Michael Sheen star in Gallowglass.
 The Slate (arts programme)

 Sport 

 BBC Wales Sports Personality of the Year – Colin Jackson
 Football – The Wales national football team achieves its highest ever FIFA ranking (27).
 Golf – Wales wins the European Amateur Men's Team Championship in the Czech Republic.
 Rowing – The Celtic Challenge becomes a regular (biennial) event.

 Births 

 22 January
 Ben Lake, Plaid Cymru, MP
 Tom Price, rugby player
 13 February – Sophie Evans, singer and actress
 1 March – Gwion Edwards, footballer
 10 March – Tom Davies, rugby player
 21 March – Jade Jones, taekwondo competitor
 4 April – Cerys Hale, rugby player
 24 April – Ben Davies, footballer
 2 May – Owain Doull, cyclist
 5 May – Rhodri Williams, rugby player
 29 June – Jak Jones, snooker player
 2 August – Gareth Thomas, rugby player
 20 September – Jordan Williams, rugby player
 6 October – Sam Davies, rugby player
 3 November – Josh Griffiths, marathon runner
 24 November – Chelsea Lewis, netball player
 26 November – Rhodri Hughes, rugby player
 27 November – Sion Bennett, rugby player
 31 December – Dave Richards, footballer

 Deaths 

 27 January – Rhys H. Williams, rugby player, 62
 10 March – Bill Price, physicist, 83
 7 April – Terry Price, rugby player, 47
 21 April – Lyn Thomas, footballer, 72
 23 April – Daniel Jones, composer, 80
 21 May – Cliff Tucker, politician and benefactor of the University of Wales, Lampeter, 80
 27 May
 Dennis Powell, boxer, 68
 Trevor Thomas, art historian, 85
 30 May – Mel Rees, footballer, 26
 29 July – Gwilym R. Jones, editor and poet, 90
 20 August – Iorwerth Hughes, Wales football international goalkeeper, 68
 4 September – Haydn Davies, cricketer, 81
 2 October – John James, historical novelist, 69
 October – Ivor Griffiths, footballer, 75
 17 November – Gordon Richards, footballer, 60
 30 November – Wogan Philipps, 2nd Baron Milford, politician, 91
 1 December – Lynette Davies, actress, 45
 4 December – Roy Vernon, footballer, 56
 10 December – Roland Davies, comic book artist and animator, 89
 13 December – Francis Jones, herald, 85
 19 December – Owain Owain, novelist, short story writer and poet, 64
 date unknown''
 T. Rees Thomas, Congregationalist minister, 82/3
 Rheinallt Nantlais Williams, philosopher of religion and college principal, 81/2

See also 

 1993 in Northern Ireland

References 

Wales